Xigazê railway station is a railway station in Xigazê, Tibet Autonomous Region, China. It lies in Jiacuoxiong Township, Samzhubzê District.
The station officially opened for operations on 16 August 2014.

Track layout 
The Xigazê passenger railway station is large compared to current needs as it has five tracks serving two island platforms and a single side platform.  Islands reserved for expansion include international (or at least to the border) plans for China–India railway link to Yadong as well as China–Nepal railway link to Gyirong and at some point, Kathmandu.

See also 
 Xigazê
 Lari railway

Scenery along the Lhasa-Shigatse Railway

References

External links 

 Lhasa-Xigaze railway officially put into use including large photo of Xigazê railway station

Stations on the Lhasa–Xigazê Railway
Railway stations in Tibet
Shigatse
Railway stations in China opened in 2014